Southwest Corridor Park is a linear urban park in Boston, Massachusetts,  part of the Metropolitan Park System of Greater Boston and managed by the Massachusetts Department of Conservation and Recreation (DCR). It extends from the South End and Back Bay neighborhoods south for almost five miles (8 km), ending in the Forest Hills section of Jamaica Plain in what was originally planned to be the alignment for Interstate 95 to Boston. It closely follows the routes of regional Amtrak and Commuter Rail lines and the Massachusetts Bay Transportation Authority (MBTA) Orange Line rapid transit rail line, from its Back Bay Station to its terminus at Forest Hills station. It features tennis courts, basketball courts, playgrounds, and walking, jogging, and biking paths.

History 
Starting in the 1960s, hundreds of acres of South End, Roxbury and Jamaica Plain housing were razed along what became known as the Southwest Corridor to build a 4.6 mile (7.4 km) section of Interstate 95 to be called the Southwest Expressway into downtown Boston. This mass demolition sparked massive community protest, which was marked by the painting of "STOP I-95 — PEOPLE BEFORE HIGHWAYS" on a local train-track wall, as a harbinger of the Southwest Corridor's future rail transit and community park use.

The protest prompted Governor Francis W. Sargent to cancel the highway project in 1969, and to become a strong advocate for changing the federal laws governing aid to states for highway construction so that more funds were available for mass transit projects such as subways and light-rail vehicles. I-95 was then routed along the existing Massachusetts Route 128 corridor in the suburbs. In 1973, Congress approved the Interstate Transfer Option, which allowed states to transfer federal funding for highways to mass transit projects.

Construction for the park was then done in conjunction with the project to reroute the MBTA Orange Line down the existing rail right-of-way which the planned highway was to follow. Since land acquisition and demolition of structures had already taken place along the route's path prior to the cancellation of the highway project, the Southwest Corridor remained a "terrible urban scar" for nearly ten years. However, local residents began to grow community gardens on the land, which gradually multiplied and ultimately led to the commencement of park construction in 1978. The first segments of the park opened in 1987, while the remainder to the South End and Back Bay was finished in the following years. A ribbon-cutting ceremony for the completed Southwest Corridor Park took place on May 5, 1990.

Description
It extends from the South End and Back Bay neighborhoods south through the Roxbury and Jamaica Plain neighborhoods before ending in the Forest Hills section of Jamaica Plain. Along its route are tennis courts, playgrounds, basketball courts, and walking, jogging, and biking trails which also connect to Boston's Emerald Necklace at the Arborway in Forest Hills.

See also
Emerald Necklace

References

External links
Southwest Corridor Park Department of Conservation and Recreation

Parks in Boston
State parks of Massachusetts
Protected areas established in 1987
1987 establishments in Massachusetts